Noyo Harbor is the port and boat docking area for Fort Bragg, California, USA. It is built near the mouth of the Noyo River in the town of Noyo, just south of Fort Bragg. Highway 1 passes over the Noyo Bridge above the harbor.

Movies
Scenes in several movies have been filmed in the harbor including:

The Russians Are Coming, the Russians Are Coming
Humanoids from the Deep
Overboard
Dying Young

Gallery

External links

Noyo Harbor
Noyo Harbor District

Ports and harbors of California
Geography of Mendocino County, California